Potôčky is a village and municipality in Stropkov District in the Prešov Region of north-eastern Slovakia.

History
In historical records the village was first mentioned in 1567.

Geography
The municipality lies at an altitude of 244 metres and covers an area of 3.358 km². It has a population of about 70 people.

References

External links
 
http://www.statistics.sk/mosmis/eng/run.html

Villages and municipalities in Stropkov District
Zemplín (region)